was the fourth of the nine post stations of the Minoji. It is located in the city of Inazawa, Aichi Prefecture, Japan.

History
Originally, the post station was just a village named "Inaba" (稲葉村 ) but the neighboring village of Kozawa (小沢村 ). The two villages merged and combined their characters to form the city of Inazawa (稲沢). There are only stone markers at the location of the former honjin and toiya, but many old buildings from the time period remain.

Oda Nobukatsu, lord of Kiyosu Castle, built this post station prior to the Battle of Komaki and Nagakute.

Neighboring post towns
Minoji
Kiyosu-juku - Inaba-juku - Hagiwara-juku

References

Post stations in Aichi Prefecture